Hypopyra configurans is a moth of the family Erebidae. It is found in Brazil (Amazonas).

References

Moths described in 1858
Hypopyra
Moths of South America